Moe Nya Einmet Myu, is a 2009 Burmese drama film starring Nay Toe, Moe Hay Ko, Thinzar Wint Kyaw and Soe Pyae Thazin. In this film, Nay Toe acted in characters of three life.

Synopsis
The first character name of Nay Toe is Mg Nyo Maing and he meet with Dr. Ma Thet Yi.
The second character name is Ko Myint Wai and he meet with Htar.
The third character name is Ko Thit Sar and he meet with Chit Thet Nwe.

Cast

Main
Nay Toe as Mg Nyo Maing, Ko Myint Wai, Ko Thit Sar
Moe Hay Ko as Dr. Ma Thet Yi
Thinzar Wint Kyaw as Chit Thet Nwe 
Soe Pyae Thazin as Htar

Supporting
Aung Lwin as U Ohn Hlaing
Khin Thida Tun as Htar mommy, mother of Htar
Ye Aung as Ko Min Lwin
Nwet Nwet San as Daw Oo
Htun Htun Win as U Min Khine
Kutho as Myittar

Award

References

2009 films
2000s Burmese-language films
Burmese drama films
Films shot in Myanmar
2009 drama films